"Don't Tell Me (What Love Can Do)" is a song by American hard rock band Van Halen from their 1995 album Balance. It is one of four singles issued for the album, and was the only one to reach #1 on the Billboard Album Rock Tracks chart, where it stayed for three weeks.

Chuck Klosterman of Vulture.com ranked it the 67th-best Van Halen song, calling it "the best song off the worst Van Halen album that isn’t Van Halen III."

Theme and references

The song's main theme is about the power of universal love. Sammy Hagar says in his autobiography that he wanted the song to be uplifting, for the chorus to be 'I wanna show you what love can do', but that his relationship with the Van Halen brothers was becoming strained and that they were very critical of the lyrical treatment, wanting something with more attitude.

In addition, the story about the death of Nirvana's frontman, Kurt Cobain, is also told in the song through the lyrics "Is it right to take the easy way" and ends with "I can't tell you what's right for you" with the bridge, repeated towards the end of the song, saying "I see the damage done, yeah/oh Lord, I heard the shotgun".

Music video
The music video for the song was shot in December 1994; it was completed on December 12.

The video tells of the young husband from the video of "Can't Stop Lovin' You" during his prison sentence. The scenes show him and his friend doing a store robbery, along with his arrest, sentence to prison, his time there, activities and his brawl with an Asian inmate which ends with a brutal wrestle by the prison authorities and inmates who are close friends of the Asian inmate. The young man is then comforted by a man who visits him and the last scene of the video shows that he's due to be released. Interspersed are victims who, along with neon signs, display the attacks they survived such as that of gunshot, drive-by shooting, sexual assault, knifing, and more while the band is shown playing the song.

References

1995 singles
Van Halen songs
Song recordings produced by Bruce Fairbairn
1995 songs
Songs written by Alex Van Halen
Songs written by Eddie Van Halen
Songs written by Michael Anthony (musician)
Songs written by Sammy Hagar
Warner Records singles
Commemoration songs